is a Japanese footballer currently playing as a goalkeeper for Omiya Ardija.

Career statistics

Club
.

Notes

References

External links

1996 births
Living people
Sportspeople from Nara Prefecture
Association football people from Nara Prefecture
Kwansei Gakuin University alumni
Japanese footballers
Association football goalkeepers
Japan Football League players
J2 League players
Kyoto Sanga FC players
Nara Club players
Omiya Ardija players